The 1961 BRSCC British Saloon Car Championship, was the fourth season of the championship. It began at Snetterton on 25 March and finished after 9 races back at Snetterton on 30 September. The championship switched to the new Group 2 regulations. This year saw the first championship win for a Mini, with a car driven by John Whitmore, winning the title in his debut season.

Calendar & Winners
All races were held in the United Kingdom. Overall winners in bold.

Championship results

References

External links 
Official website of the British Touring Car Championship

British Touring Car Championship seasons
British Saloon Car Championship